Samuel Johnson's Life of Mr Richard Savage (1744), short title Life of Savage and full title An Account of the Life of Mr Richard Savage, Son of the Earl Rivers, was the first major biography published by Johnson. It was released anonymously in 1744, and detailed the life of Richard Savage, a London poet and friend of Johnson who had died in 1743. The biography contains many details of Savage's account of his own life, including claims that he was the illegitimate child of a noble family that quickly disowned and abandoned him at birth.

Savage had led a controversial life, and Johnson used the material to try to answer some wider ethical questions. The text was later included in The Lives of the Poets, published in 1779, and this work is attributed as one of the important steps for Johnson becoming a biographer in his later years. The biography was well received and was the source of early praise for Johnson. This praise has continued 200 years after its original publication, and it has been described as "one of the best short biographies in English".

Background

The Life of Savage was not Johnson's first biography. In 1740 he wrote short biographies of Jean-Philippe Baratier, Robert Blake, and Francis Drake. Before this time, between 1737 and 1739, Johnson was close to Savage. Savage was both a poet and a playwright, and Johnson was reported to enjoy spending time and discussing various topics with him, along with drinking and other merriment. However, that lifestyle could not continue, and Savage was encouraged by his friends to move to Bristol and clean up his life. He was unable to accomplish this which led to him being sent to debtors' prison and dying in 1743.

Immediately after Savage died, various periodicals were printing biographical material on the dead poet. Edward Cave, Johnson's publisher, encouraged Johnson to put together a life of his friend. Johnson began to collect as many letters and biographical details as he could and, with his extensive history with Savage, produced his work. Johnson dedicated a large portion of his time to the work, and was able to produce, as he claimed, "forty-eight of the printed octavo pages of the life of Savage at a sitting, but then I sat up all night."

Johnson finished the work just before the Christmas of 1743 and was paid fifteen guineas. It was published anonymously and contained almost 200 pages. It was immediately successful, but it was not the financial success that Johnson or Cave wanted nor did it extend Johnson's reputation at the time. However, it did form an important beginning for Johnson as a biographer, and the work was later included in his Lives of the Most Eminent English Poets series.

Life of Savage
Although the work is a biography, it was a partial version of Savage's life as told by a friend and contained many minor errors. In particular, Johnson accepted Savage's own story that he was a disowned bastard of a noble family, even though there was little evidence to be found. However, Johnson did not hide the flaws of his friend. Johnson exposed the many faults of Savage, but he always felt that Savage was ultimately wronged throughout his life and should ultimately be admired.

Critical response
Joshua Reynolds, Johnson's friend, told James Boswell that "It seized his attention so strongly that, not being able to lay down the book till he had finished it, when he attempted to move, he found his arm totally benumbed."

Walter Jackson Bate writes that the Life of Savage "remains one of the innovative works in the history of biography". Margaret Lane writes that the Life of Savage "is still the most absorbing of all Johnson's brief biographies and its news value at the time made it compulsive reading."

Notes

References

External links
 The Life of Savage, ed. George Birkbeck Hill and Jack Lynch

1744 books
Biographies about writers
English poetry
Books by Samuel Johnson
British biographies
Works published anonymously